Rennie is a given name, nickname and surname.

People with the surname 

 Alistair Rennie, Scottish author
 Allan Rennie (born 1960), Scottish footballer
 Andy Rennie (Scottish footballer) (1901–1938), footballer with Luton Town
 Andy Rennie (New Zealand footballer), New Zealand footballer
 Bob Rennie (born 1956), Canadian real estate marketer and art collector
 Bryan Rennie (historian) (born 1954), British historian of religions
 Bryan Rennie (rugby union) (born 1984), South African rugby union player
 Callum Keith Rennie (born 1960), Canadian actor
 Connor Rennie (born 1991), Scottish footballer
 David Rennie (film editor), American film editor
 David Rennie (footballer) (born 1964), Scottish footballer
 Edward Rennie (1852–1927), Australian scientist
 Eliza Rennie (ca. 1813–unknown) Scottish romantic/Gothic short story author
 Frank Rennie (1918–1992), New Zealand soldier
 Gavin Rennie (born 1976), Zimbabwean cricketer
 Gaye Rennie (born 1949), American model
 George Rennie (agriculturalist) (1749–1828), British agriculturalist
 George Rennie (engineer) (1791–1866), British civil engineer
 George Rennie (sculptor and politician) (c. 1801–1860), British sculptor and Member of Parliament
 Gordon Rennie, Scottish music journalist and comics writer
 Harry Rennie (1873–1954), Scottish footballer
 Iain Rennie (born 1964), New Zealand civil servant
 James Rennie (disambiguation)
 John Rennie the Elder (1761–1821), Scottish civil engineer
 John Rennie the Younger (1794–1874), British civil engineer
 John Rennie (naval architect) (1842–1918), Scottish naval architect
 John Rennie (MI6 officer) (1914–1981), Director of MI6
 John Rennie (GC) (1919–1943), British soldier awarded the George Cross
 John Rennie (editor) (born 1959), editor-in-chief of Scientific American
 John Rennie (cricketer) (born 1970), Zimbabwean Test and ODI cricketer
 John Shaw Rennie (1917–1981), Governor-General of Mauritius 
 Martin Rennie, Scottish football manager
 Michael Rennie (1909–1971), English actor
 Nathan Rennie (born 1981), Australian cyclist
 Rhoda Rennie (born 1909), South African swimmer
 Ross Rennie (born 1986), Scottish rugby union player 
 Tom Rennie (1900–1945) British Army general killed in action 
 Uriah Rennie (born 1959), English football referee
 William Hepburn Rennie (1829–1874), an 1800s British colonial official
 William Rennie (Victoria Cross) (1821–1896), Scottish recipient of the Victoria Cross
 Willie Rennie (born 1967), Scottish politician

People with the given name

Male 

 Rennie Airth (born 1935), South African writer
 Rennie Montague Bere (1907–1991), British mountaineer, naturalist and nature conservationist
 Rennie Davis (1941–2021), American anti-war activist, one of the Chicago Seven
 Rennie Wilbur Doane (1871–1942), American entomologist and zoologist
 Rennie Ellis (1940–2003), Australian photographer
 Rennie Harris, (born 1964), dancer, choreographer, director
 Rennie Harrison, English footballer
 Rennie Hatzke (born 1955), German pop musician
 Rennie MacInnes (1870–1931), Anglican bishop
 Rennie Pilgrem, English electronic music producer
 Rennie Simmons (born 1942), American football coach
 Rennie Smith (1888–1962), English politician
 Rennie Stennett (born 1951), Panamanian-born baseball player

Female 

 Irene Rennie Fritchie, Baroness Fritchie (born 1942), British civil servant

Fictional characters 

 Rennie Wickham, the protagonist of Friday the 13th Part VIII: Jason Takes Manhattan, portrayed by Jensen Daggett

See also 

 Renny, another given name and surname
 Renié Conley (1901–1992), Hollywood costume designer

Surnames
English-language surnames
Lists of people by nickname
Hypocorisms